Caroline Black may refer to:

 Caroline Black (botanist) (1887–1930), American botanist
 Caroline Black (badminton) (born 1994), Irish badminton player